This is a list of 399 species in Lissonota, a genus of ichneumon wasps in the family Ichneumonidae.

Lissonota species

 Lissonota absenta Chandra & Gupta, 1977 c g
 Lissonota accusator (Fabricius, 1793) c g
 Lissonota aciculata Townes, 1978 c g
 Lissonota acrobasidis (Ashmead, 1896) c g
 Lissonota admontenis Strobl, 1902 g
 Lissonota admontensis Strobl, 1902 c g
 Lissonota adornata Chandra, 1976 c g
 Lissonota aequalis (Constantineanu & Constantineanu, 1968) c g
 Lissonota albicaudata Chandra & Gupta, 1977 c g
 Lissonota albicoxis Kriechbaumer, 1888 c g
 Lissonota albipennis Townes, 1978 c g
 Lissonota albivitta Townes, 1978 c g
 Lissonota albomaculata (Cameron, 1899) c g
 Lissonota albopicta Smith, 1878 c g
 Lissonota aleutiana (Cresson, 1879) c g
 Lissonota alpestris (Cameron, 1886) c
 Lissonota alpina Habermehl, 1926 c g
 Lissonota alpinicola Bauer, 1985 c g
 Lissonota alpinistor Aubert, 1978 c g
 Lissonota alpivagator Aubert, 1976 c g
 Lissonota alutacea Townes, 1978 c g
 Lissonota alveata Townes, 1978 c g
 Lissonota amabilis Habermehl, 1918 c g
 Lissonota amatellae Townes, 1978 c g
 Lissonota amphithyris Townes, 1978 c g
 Lissonota angulata Townes, 1978 c g
 Lissonota angusta Taschenberg, 1863 c g
 Lissonota anipta Townes, 1978 c g
 Lissonota anomala Holmgren, 1860 g
 Lissonota antennalis Thomson, 1877 c g
 Lissonota anthophila Townes, 1978 c g
 Lissonota aorba Ugalde & Gauld, 2002 c g
 Lissonota apprima Townes, 1978 c g
 Lissonota argiola Gravenhorst, 1829 c g
 Lissonota aspera Bain, 1970 c g
 Lissonota atra Bain, 1970 c g
 Lissonota atrella Townes, 1978 c g
 Lissonota atrimalis Townes, 1978 c g
 Lissonota atropos Schmiedeknecht, 1900 c g
 Lissonota aurantia Chandra, 1976 c g
 Lissonota axillaris Townes, 1978 c g
 Lissonota aziba Ugalde & Gauld, 2002 c g
 Lissonota azteca (Cresson, 1874) c g
 Lissonota babela Ugalde & Gauld, 2002 c g
 Lissonota balia Townes, 1978 c g
 Lissonota barbator Aubert, 1972 c g
 Lissonota bella Chandra, 1976 c g
 Lissonota benoiti Townes, 1973 c g
 Lissonota bezaga Ugalde & Gauld, 2002 c g
 Lissonota bicincta Szepligeti, 1899 c g
 Lissonota biguttata Holmgren, 1860 c g
 Lissonota bilineata Gravenhorst, 1829 c g
 Lissonota bipartita Costa, 1886 c g
 Lissonota bispota Chandra & Gupta, 1977 c g
 Lissonota bistrigata Holmgren, 1860 c g
 Lissonota bivittata Gravenhorst, 1829 c g
 Lissonota boreliiphaga Rousse, 2016 g
 Lissonota brevipappus Townes, 1978 c g
 Lissonota breviseta Ratzeburg, 1852 c g
 Lissonota breviventris (Walsh, 1873) c g
 Lissonota brunnea Cresson, 1868 c g
 Lissonota buccator (Thunberg, 1822) c g
 Lissonota buolianae Hartig, 1838 c g
 Lissonota burmensis Chandra & Gupta, 1977 c g
 Lissonota busoma Chandra & Gupta, 1977 c g
 Lissonota calva Townes, 1978 c g
 Lissonota camptoneura Townes, 1978 c g
 Lissonota canula Ugalde & Gauld, 2002 c g
 Lissonota carbonaria Holmgren, 1860 c g
 Lissonota carinulata Sheng, 2000 c g
 Lissonota castaneae Chandra & Gupta, 1977 c g
 Lissonota catamelas Townes, 1978 c g
 Lissonota cephalotes Townes, 1978 c g
 Lissonota chelata Townes, 1978 c g
 Lissonota chinensis (Cushman, 1922) c g
 Lissonota chosensis (Uchida, 1955) c
 Lissonota clypealis Thomson, 1877 c g
 Lissonota clypearis Costa, 1886 c g
 Lissonota clypeator (Gravenhorst, 1820) c g
 Lissonota coloradensis (Cresson, 1870) c
 Lissonota compar Fonscolombe, 1854 c g
 Lissonota complicator Aubert, 1967 c g
 Lissonota compressa Townes, 1978 c g
 Lissonota compta Townes, 1978 c g
 Lissonota conferta Townes, 1978 c g
 Lissonota conflagrata Gravenhorst, 1829 c g
 Lissonota confusa Rey del Castillo, 1992 c g
 Lissonota conocola Rohwer, 1920 c g
 Lissonota conulla Ugalde & Gauld, 2002 c g
 Lissonota coracina (Gmelin, 1790) c g
 Lissonota coracinata Chandra & Gupta, 1977 c g
 Lissonota costulata Townes, 1978 c g
 Lissonota cracens Townes, 1978 c g
 Lissonota cracentis Chandra & Gupta, 1977 c g
 Lissonota crevieri (Provancher, 1874) c g
 Lissonota cribraria Townes, 1978 c g
 Lissonota crudeta Ugalde & Gauld, 2002 c g
 Lissonota cruentator (Panzer, 1809) c g
 Lissonota cruralis Townes, 1978 c g
 Lissonota culiciformis Gravenhorst, 1829 c g
 Lissonota curticauda Townes, 1978 c g
 Lissonota curtiterebra Chandra & Gupta, 1977 c g
 Lissonota curtiventris Horstmann & Yu, 1999 c g
 Lissonota dakrumae (Ashmead, 1896) c g
 Lissonota danielsi Chandra & Gupta, 1977 c g
 Lissonota daschi Townes, 1978 c g
 Lissonota davisi (Townes, 1944) c g
 Lissonota densata Townes, 1978 c g
 Lissonota depressifronta Chandra & Gupta, 1977 c g
 Lissonota deversor Gravenhorst, 1829 c g
 Lissonota digestor (Thunberg, 1822) c g
 Lissonota dineta Ugalde & Gauld, 2002 c g
 Lissonota disrupta (Cockerell, 1921) c g
 Lissonota distincta Bridgman, 1889 c g
 Lissonota dreisbachorum Townes, 1978 c g
 Lissonota dubia Holmgren, 1856 c g
 Lissonota dusmeti (Seyrig, 1927) c g
 Lissonota electra Viereck, 1903 c g
 Lissonota elegantissima (Hellen, 1940) c g
 Lissonota elongator (Schiodte, 1839) c g
 Lissonota erythrina Holmgren, 1860 c g
 Lissonota eurycorsa Townes, 1978 c g
 Lissonota evetriae Rohwer, 1920 c g
 Lissonota excelsa Schmiedeknecht, 1900 c g
 Lissonota exculta Chandra & Gupta, 1977 c g
 Lissonota exigua (Cresson, 1870) c g
 Lissonota exilis (Cresson, 1870) c g
 Lissonota exophthalmus Townes, 1978 c g
 Lissonota extrema Hedwig, 1932 c g
 Lissonota fascipennis Townes, 1978 c g
 Lissonota fenella Viereck, 1903 c g
 Lissonota filiformis Sheng, 2000 c g
 Lissonota fissa Brischke, 1865 c g
 Lissonota flavicruris Chandra & Gupta, 1977 c g
 Lissonota flavipectus Townes, 1978 c g
 Lissonota flavofasciata Chandra & Gupta, 1977 c g
 Lissonota flavopicta Smith, 1878 c g
 Lissonota flavovariegata (Lucas, 1849) c g
 Lissonota fletcheri Bridgman, 1882 c g
 Lissonota folii Thomson, 1877 c g
 Lissonota freyi (Hellen, 1915) c g
 Lissonota frontalis (Desvignes, 1856) c g
 Lissonota fugata Ugalde & Gauld, 2002 c g
 Lissonota fulva Bain, 1970 c g
 Lissonota fulvicornis Townes, 1978 c g
 Lissonota fulvipes (Desvignes, 1856) c g
 Lissonota fundator (Thunberg, 1822) c g
 Lissonota funebris Habermehl, 1923 c
 Lissonota fuscifacies Chandra & Gupta, 1977 c g
 Lissonota fuscipes (Cameron, 1903) c g
 Lissonota fuscipilis Townes, 1978 c g
 Lissonota genator Aubert, 1972 c g
 Lissonota genoplana Townes, 1978 c g
 Lissonota gibboclypeata Chandra, 1976 c g
 Lissonota giganta (Uchida, 1928) c g
 Lissonota gracilenta Holmgren, 1860 c g
 Lissonota gracilipes Thomson, 1877 c g
 Lissonota granulata Chandra, 1976 c g
 Lissonota greeni Cameron, 1905 c
 Lissonota gurna Ugalde & Gauld, 2002 c g
 Lissonota halidayi Holmgren, 1860 c g
 Lissonota hamus (Uchida, 1940) c g
 Lissonota heinrichi Townes, 1978 c g
 Lissonota heterodoxa Fonscolombe, 1854 c g
 Lissonota hilaris (Cresson, 1879) c g
 Lissonota hildae (Gyorfi, 1941) c g
 Lissonota himachala Chandra & Gupta, 1977 c g
 Lissonota histrio (Fabricius, 1798) c
 Lissonota horpa Ugalde & Gauld, 2002 c g
 Lissonota hortorum Gravenhorst, 1829 c g
 Lissonota humerella Thomson, 1877 c g
 Lissonota hungarica Schmiedeknecht, 1900 c g
 Lissonota ibericator Aubert, 1972 c g
 Lissonota imitatrix (Walsh, 1873) c g
 Lissonota impressor Gravenhorst, 1829 c g
 Lissonota inareolata Pfeffer, 1913 c g
 Lissonota inconspicua Schmiedeknecht, 1935 c g
 Lissonota inconstans Cushman, 1940 c g
 Lissonota incrassata Chandra & Gupta, 1977 c g
 Lissonota infulata Townes, 1978 c
 Lissonota insita (Cresson, 1870) c g
 Lissonota irrasa Townes, 1978 c g
 Lissonota jacobi (Walley, 1942) c g
 Lissonota jaei Townes, 1978 c g
 Lissonota japonica (Ashmead, 1906) c g
 Lissonota jonathani Chandra & Gupta, 1977 c g
 Lissonota justina Ugalde & Gauld, 2002 c g
 Lissonota kaiyuanensis Uchida, 1942 c g
 Lissonota kamathi Chandra & Gupta, 1977 c g
 Lissonota kambaitensis Chandra & Gupta, 1977 c g
 Lissonota kircosa Chandra & Gupta, 1977 c g
 Lissonota kolae (Morley, 1933) c g
 Lissonota kolpa Ugalde & Gauld, 2002 c g
 Lissonota kurilensis Uchida, 1928 c g
 Lissonota laeviceps Townes, 1978 c g
 Lissonota laevigata (Cresson, 1870) c g
 Lissonota lathami Townes, 1978 c g
 Lissonota laticincta Townes, 1978 c g
 Lissonota leionotum Townes, 1978 c g
 Lissonota leiponeura Townes, 1978 c g
 Lissonota lema Ugalde & Gauld, 2002 c g
 Lissonota lenis Townes, 1978 c g
 Lissonota leptalea Townes, 1978 c g
 Lissonota leptura Townes, 1978 c g
 Lissonota leucogenys Townes, 1978 c g
 Lissonota leucophrys Townes, 1978 c g
 Lissonota leucopoda Cameron, 1886 c g
 Lissonota leucopus Townes, 1978 c g
 Lissonota leucoscelis Townes, 1978 c g
 Lissonota leurosa Chandra & Gupta, 1977 c g
 Lissonota limbata Townes, 1978 c g
 Lissonota linearis Gravenhorst, 1829 c g
 Lissonota lineata Gravenhorst, 1829 c g
 Lissonota lineolaris (Gmelin, 1790) c g
 Lissonota lirata Townes, 1978 c g
 Lissonota lissolabis Townes, 1978 c g
 Lissonota lissonotator Aubert, 1977 c g
 Lissonota longigena Bauer, 1985 c g
 Lissonota longior Townes, 1978 c g
 Lissonota longispiracularis (Uchida, 1940) c g
 Lissonota lophota Townes, 1978 c g
 Lissonota luffiator Aubert, 1969 c g
 Lissonota macqueeni Chandra, 1976 c g
 Lissonota macra (Cresson, 1870) c
 Lissonota maculata Brischke, 1865 c g
 Lissonota maculiventris (Rohwer, 1913) c g
 Lissonota magdalenae Pfankuch, 1921 c g
 Lissonota malaisei Chandra & Gupta, 1977 c g
 Lissonota manca Brauns, 1896 c g
 Lissonota mandschurica (Uchida, 1942) c g
 Lissonota marginata (Provancher, 1873) c g
 Lissonota mediterranea Seyrig, 1927 c g
 Lissonota mesorufa (Momoi, 1970) c
 Lissonota mexicana (Cameron, 1886) c
 Lissonota michaelis Rey del Castillo, 1990 c g
 Lissonota microstoma Townes, 1978 c g
 Lissonota minuenta Morley, 1913 c g
 Lissonota monona Ugalde & Gauld, 2002 c g
 Lissonota monosticta Kriechbaumer, 1900 c g
 Lissonota morum Morley, 1913 c g
 Lissonota muertae Ugalde & Gauld, 2002 c g
 Lissonota mulleola Chandra & Gupta, 1977 c g
 Lissonota multicolor Colenso, 1885 c g
 Lissonota mutator Aubert, 1969 c g
 Lissonota neixiangica Sheng, 2000 c g
 Lissonota nigra Brischke, 1880 c g
 Lissonota nigricornis (Provancher, 1873) c
 Lissonota nigricorpa Chandra & Gupta, 1977 c g
 Lissonota nigridens Thomson, 1889 c g
 Lissonota nigromacra Townes, 1978 c g
 Lissonota nigrominiata Chandra & Gupta, 1977 c g
 Lissonota nigroscutellata Chandra, 1976 c g
 Lissonota nirna Ugalde & Gauld, 2002 c g
 Lissonota nishiguchii (Momoi, 1962) c g
 Lissonota nitida (Gravenhorst, 1829) c g
 Lissonota oblongata Chandra & Gupta, 1977 c g
 Lissonota obscuripes Strobl, 1902 c g
 Lissonota obsoleta Bridgman, 1889 c g
 Lissonota occidentalis (Cresson, 1870) c
 Lissonota ocularis Townes, 1978 c g
 Lissonota oculatoria (Fabricius, 1798) c g
 Lissonota oncolaba Townes, 1978 c g
 Lissonota orophila Townes, 1978 c g
 Lissonota otaruensis (Uchida, 1928) c
 Lissonota pallipleuris Townes, 1978 c g
 Lissonota palpalis Thomson, 1889 c g
 Lissonota parasitellae Horstmann, 2003 c g
 Lissonota parva (Cresson, 1870) c
 Lissonota paula Chandra & Gupta, 1977 c g
 Lissonota peckorum Townes, 1978 c g
 Lissonota pectinata (Benoit, 1955) c g
 Lissonota pectinator Aubert, 1972 c g
 Lissonota penerecta Townes, 1978 c g
 Lissonota pentazona Townes, 1978 c g
 Lissonota perina Ugalde & Gauld, 2002 c g
 Lissonota persimilis (Cameron, 1886) c g
 Lissonota perspicillator Gravenhorst, 1829 c
 Lissonota petila Townes, 1978 c g
 Lissonota petiolata Sheng, 2000 c g
 Lissonota pevola Ugalde & Gauld, 2002 c g
 Lissonota philippinensis Chandra & Gupta, 1977 c g
 Lissonota picta Boie, 1850 c g
 Lissonota picticoxis Schmiedeknecht, 1900 c g
 Lissonota pimplator (Zetterstedt, 1838) c g
 Lissonota pinguicula Townes, 1978 c g
 Lissonota pleuralis Brischke, 1880 c g
 Lissonota polonica Habermehl, 1918 c g
 Lissonota populi Townes, 1978 c g
 Lissonota posticalis Townes, 1978 c g
 Lissonota prionoxysti (Rohwer, 1915) c g
 Lissonota pristina (Brues, 1910) c g
 Lissonota prolixa Chandra & Gupta, 1977 c g
 Lissonota proxima Fonscolombe, 1854 c g
 Lissonota pseudeleboea Ugalde & Gauld, 2002 c g
 Lissonota punctata (Cresson, 1870) c g
 Lissonota punctipleuris Townes, 1978 c g
 Lissonota punctiventrator Aubert, 1977 c g
 Lissonota punctiventris Thomson, 1877 c
 Lissonota punctor Aubert, 1976 c g
 Lissonota punctulata Szepligeti, 1899 c
 Lissonota purpurea Seyrig, 1928 c g
 Lissonota pygmaea Strobl, 1902 c g
 Lissonota qilianica Sheng, 2006 c g
 Lissonota quadrata Szepligeti, 1899 c
 Lissonota quadrinotata Gravenhorst, 1829 c g
 Lissonota quinqueangularis Ratzeburg, 1852 c g
 Lissonota rasilis Townes, 1978 c g
 Lissonota reniculellae Townes, 1978 c g
 Lissonota risola Ugalde & Gauld, 2002 c g
 Lissonota robusta Ratzeburg, 1852 c g
 Lissonota roveba Ugalde & Gauld, 2002 c g
 Lissonota rubida Chandra, 1976 c g
 Lissonota rubrica (Cresson, 1870) c g b
 Lissonota rubricosa Brischke, 1880 c g
 Lissonota rufescens Boie, 1850 c g
 Lissonota rufina Costa, 1886 c g
 Lissonota rufipes Brischke, 1865 c g
 Lissonota rufitarsis Szepligeti, 1899 c g
 Lissonota rugosa Chandra, 1976 c g
 Lissonota rushi Townes, 1978 c g
 Lissonota russata Townes, 1978 c g
 Lissonota russula Chandra & Gupta, 1977 c g
 Lissonota sahlbergi Hellen, 1915 c g
 Lissonota sakala Cushman, 1942 c g
 Lissonota salubria Ugalde & Gauld, 2002 c g
 Lissonota samuelsoni (Momoi, 1970) c
 Lissonota sapinea Townes, Momoi & Townes, 1965 c g
 Lissonota sardanator Aubert, 1969 c g
 Lissonota saturator (Thunberg, 1822) c g
 Lissonota saxenai Chandra & Gupta, 1977 c g
 Lissonota scabra Brischke, 1880 c
 Lissonota scabricauda Townes, 1978 c g
 Lissonota schmiedeknechti Smits van Burgst, 1914 c
 Lissonota scutellaris (Cresson, 1870) c
 Lissonota sector (Thunberg, 1822) c g
 Lissonota segnis (Cresson, 1879) c g
 Lissonota semirufa (Desvignes, 1856) c
 Lissonota semitropis Townes, 1978 c g
 Lissonota serrulota Sheng, 2000 c g
 Lissonota setosa (Geoffroy, 1785) c g
 Lissonota sevina Ugalde & Gauld, 2002 c g
 Lissonota sexcincta (Ashmead, 1890) c g
 Lissonota shenefelti Townes, 1978 c g
 Lissonota sheni Sheng, 2000 c g
 Lissonota silvatica Habermehl, 1918 c g
 Lissonota spilocephala Cameron, 1906 c g
 Lissonota spilostethus Townes, 1978 c g
 Lissonota stenops Townes, 1978 c g
 Lissonota stenostoma Townes, 1978 c g
 Lissonota sternalis Costa, 1886 c g
 Lissonota stigmator Aubert, 1972 c g
 Lissonota striata Sheng, 2000 c g
 Lissonota striatopetiolata Chandra & Gupta, 1977 c g
 Lissonota stygialis (Brues, 1910) c g
 Lissonota subaciculata Bridgman, 1886 c g
 Lissonota subcalva Townes, 1978 c g
 Lissonota subnodifer Townes, 1978 c g
 Lissonota subnuda Townes, 1978 c g
 Lissonota sulcula Townes, 1978 c g
 Lissonota superbator Aubert, 1967 c g
 Lissonota szepligetii Dalla Torre, 1901 c g
 Lissonota tacnaensis (Brèthes, 1916) c g
 Lissonota taeniata Townes, 1978 c g
 Lissonota tanyterebrata Chandra & Gupta, 1977 c g
 Lissonota tarsata Townes, 1978 c g
 Lissonota tauriscorum Strobl, 1902 c g
 Lissonota tegularis (Cresson, 1870) c g
 Lissonota temporalis Townes, 1978 c g
 Lissonota tenebrosa (Brues, 1910) c g
 Lissonota tenerrima Thomson, 1877 c g
 Lissonota tenuipes Townes, 1978 c g
 Lissonota terebrans Sheng, 2000 c g
 Lissonota tergolata Chandra & Gupta, 1977 c g
 Lissonota tetrazona Townes, 1978 c g
 Lissonota thuringiaca (Schmiedeknecht, 1900) c g
 Lissonota tincta Townes, 1978 c g
 Lissonota tinctibasis Townes, 1978 c g
 Lissonota tostada Ugalde & Gauld, 2002 c g
 Lissonota transsylvanica Constantineanu & Ciochia, 1968 c g
 Lissonota transversostriata (Smits van Burgst, 1921) c g
 Lissonota trichota Townes, 1978 c g
 Lissonota trifasciola Chandra & Gupta, 1977 c g
 Lissonota tristis Brischke, 1888 c g
 Lissonota trochanterator Aubert, 1972 c g
 Lissonota ulbrichtii (Ulbricht, 1909) c g
 Lissonota uncata Townes, 1978 c g
 Lissonota ustulata Chandra & Gupta, 1977 c g
 Lissonota variabilis Holmgren, 1860 c g
 Lissonota vebena Ugalde & Gauld, 2002 c g
 Lissonota veris Townes, 1978 c g
 Lissonota versicolor Holmgren, 1860 c g
 Lissonota vidua Townes, 1978 c g
 Lissonota vincta Townes, 1978 c g
 Lissonota xanthofacia Chandra & Gupta, 1977 c g
 Lissonota xanthomus Townes, 1978 c g
 Lissonota xanthophrys Townes, 1978 c g
 Lissonota xanthopyga Holmgren, 1868 c g
 Lissonota xuthosoma Chandra & Gupta, 1977 c g
 Lissonota zonalis Townes, 1978 c g

Data sources: i = ITIS, c = Catalogue of Life, g = GBIF, b = Bugguide.net

References

Lissonota